Ethel Smith may refer to:
 Ethel Smith (organist) (1902–1996), American organist
 Ethel Smith (athlete) (1907–1979), Canadian sprinter
 Ethel M. Smith (1877–1951), women's rights activist and union activist
 Ethel Morgan Smith (born 1952), American author and associate professor

See also
 Ethel Smyth (1858–1944), English composer and suffragist
 Ray F. and Ethel Smith House (1937), historic residence in Murray, Utah